Carroll Dudley Kendall (August 9, 1890 – September 20, 1975), was a Canadian professional ice hockey player who played in various professional and amateur leagues, including the Pacific Coast Hockey Association (PCHA) and National Hockey Association (NHA).  Amongst the teams he played with were the Vancouver Millionaires, Montreal Wanderers and Ottawa Senators.

He died in 1975.

Career
Kendall came up through the ranks of the Ottawa New Edinburghs and played for the club in the Ottawa City Hockey League and the Interprovincial Amateur Hockey Union between 1910–1912.

In 1912 he went west to play for the Vancouver Millionaires in the Pacific Coast Hockey Aassociation. During the 1912–13 PCHA season he finished tied second in goal scoring in the PCHA with 14 goals in 14 games.

Prior to the 1913–14 season Kendall was involved in a trade carousel with Ottawa Senators player Skene Ronan. Vancouver Millionaires manager Frank Patrick first traded Kendall to the Senators in exchange for Ronan, but Ronan refused to report to Vancouver and was suspended from playing in the upcoming season. Patrick then instead sold Kendall's rights to the Montreal Wanderers which meant that Ronan reverted back to the Ottawa Senators.

In 1915–16 he was a hold-out and did not play for the Montreal Wanderers, and in 1916–17 he instead signed with the Ottawa Senators.

Statistics

Regular season and playoffs

References

Notes

External links

Hockey History in Trail (trailhistory.com)

1890 births
1975 deaths
Canadian ice hockey centres
Ice hockey people from Quebec
Montreal Wanderers (NHA) players
Ottawa Senators (NHA) players
People from Charlemagne, Quebec
Vancouver Millionaires players